= Letrasilta =

Scientific classification
- Domain: Eukaryota
- Kingdom: Animalia
- Phylum: Arthropoda
- Class: Insecta
- Order: Lepidoptera
- Superfamily: Noctuoidea
- Family: Erebidae
- Subfamily: Arctiinae
- Tribe: Lithosiini
- Genus: Letrasilta; S.-Y. Huang & Volynkin, 2023

Genus of moths

Letrasilta is a genus in the moth family Erebidae. There are at least two described species in Letrasilta, found in China and India.

== Species ==
These two species belong to the genus Letrasilta:

- Letrasilta cernyi (Volynkin, 2018)
- Letrasilta ratnasambhava S.-Y. Huang, Volynkin & Yin, 2023
